Javed Akhtar Ansari is a Pakistani politician who was a Member of the Provincial Assembly of the Punjab, from May 2013 to May 2018 and from August 2018 to January 2023.

Early life
He was born on 1 January 1963 in Multan.

Political career

He was elected to the Provincial Assembly of the Punjab as a candidate of Pakistan Tehreek-e-Insaf (PTI) from Constituency PP-195 (Multan-II) in 2013 Pakistani general election.

He was re-elected to Provincial Assembly of the Punjab as a candidate of PTI from Constituency PP-215 (Multan-V) in 2018 Pakistani general election.

References

Living people
Punjab MPAs 2013–2018
1963 births
Pakistan Tehreek-e-Insaf MPAs (Punjab)
Punjab MPAs 2018–2023